Notable dictionaries of the Dutch language include:

Etymologicum teutonicae linguae, the first known Dutch dictionary published by Cornelius Kiliaan in 1599. It continues to be a unique source of obsolete words today.
 't Nieuw Woorden-Boeck der Regten ("The New Dictionary of Rights"), published by Adriaan Koerbagh in 1664
Een Bloemhof van allerley lieflijkheyd ("A Flower Garden of All Sorts of Delights"), written by Koerbagh under the pseudonym Vreederijk Waarmond in 1668. This book explained various foreign words and caused a great religious opposition that forced him to flee to Leiden.
Woordenboek der Nederlandsche Taal, the comprehensive academic dictionary of Dutch begun in 1863 and finished in 1998, listing all words in Dutch used since 1500.
Van Dale Groot woordenboek van de Nederlandse taal, first published in 1874 and today in its 15th edition, is the best-known Dutch language dictionary.

There are also two notable Dutch word lists (spelling dictionaries):
het Groene Boekje, the "Green Booklet", the official Dutch orthography published by the Dutch Language Union since 1954
het Witte Boekje, the "White Booklet", published since 1998 and offers alternative Dutch spellings

Dutch/English dictionary:

See also
List of French dictionaries
List of German dictionaries

Dictionaries
 

nl:Woordenboek#Nederlandse woordenboeken